Gardenhall is an affluent area of the Scottish new town East Kilbride, in South Lanarkshire.

Gardenhall is a residential district which lies on the town's south-western edge. It borders Mossneuk and Hairmyres to the East, and Newlandsmuir to the South.

It is home to the terminus bus-stop of the First Bus Greater Glasgow 21 route. It also has the Gardenhall Inn within its boundaries. 
The East Kilbride local bus service, the First Bus M1 service, as well as the Mcgills services 395/396 and 399 also pass through the area.

Areas of East Kilbride